Biological Abstracts is a database produced by Clarivate Analytics. It includes abstracts from peer-reviewed academic journal articles in the fields of biology, biochemistry, biotechnology, botany, pre-clinical and experimental medicine, pharmacology, zoology, agriculture, and veterinary medicine, and has been published since 1926.

It can be accessed through a number of services, including EBSCO, Ovid and Web of Science.

History
The service began as a print publication in 1926, when it was formed by the union of Abstracts of Bacteriology (1917–1925), and Botanical Abstracts (1919–1926), both published in Baltimore by Williams and Wilkins. It was published in paperback subject sections, with abstracts usually written by scientists in the US, as a great many articles from that period were in other languages. At the time of founding, it was in competition with the classified indexing service of the Concilium Bibliographicum in Zurich.

The first online version was published on magnetic tape; it contained only the bibliographic information, not the text of the abstracts, and was intended as a rapid alerting service.

See also 
 List of academic databases and search engines
 Lists of academic journals
 List of open-access journals
 List of scientific journals
 Google Scholar

References

Other references

External links

Clarivate
Bibliographic databases and indexes
Online databases